Acleris forbesana, the Forbes' acleris moth, is a species of moth of the family Tortricidae. It is found in North America, where it has been recorded from Alberta, British Columbia, California, Illinois, Indiana, Maine, Massachusetts, Michigan, Minnesota, New Brunswick, North Carolina, Ontario, Quebec, Tennessee and Wisconsin.

The wingspan is 13–16 mm. The forewings are whitish with a dark grey triangular patch along the costa and lighter grey patches near the anal angle, in the subterminal area and in the basal area. The hindwings are uniform pale grey or silvery. Adults have been recorded on wing from March to April and again from June to October in two or more generations per year.

The larvae feed on Cornus species (including Cornus californica and Cornus sericea).

References

Moths described in 1934
forbesana
Moths of North America